Cartoon Network (commonly abbreviated as CN) is a British pay television channel aimed at children which airs animated programming targeting children and young aged 6 to 12. It is run by Warner Bros. Discovery EMEA for localisation strategy for international markets (such as the UK) and in conjunction with Warner Bros. Television Studios UK for the production of content and global leadership of the Cartoon Network brand. The channel primarily airs animated programming.

The channel initially launched on 17 September 1993 as a larger pan-European feed, serving the UK market along with Western and Northern Europe. In August 1999, the pan-European aspect of Cartoon Network Europe was spun-off as a new feed with an identical schedule to Cartoon Network UK (the former pan-European feed). Cartoon Network UK completely ceased being a pan-European feed on 15 October 1999 which was when it was scrambled with Videocrypt and the launch of the UK only version of TNT. The pan-European feed continued to shadow Cartoon Network UK's schedule until 2001. The pan-European feed excluded shows such as Dragon Ball Z and Angela Anaconda and were substituted, as Cartoon Network did not have the pan-European broadcasting rights to these shows, only the rights for the UK and the Netherlands.

History

Pre-launch 
In October 1992, the original version of Cartoon Network was launched at CNN Center, Atlanta, US. Cartoon Network was created in response of Turner Entertainment acquiring MGM's animation library in 1986 and the acquisition of the Hanna-Barbera animation studio and cartoon library in 1991. As a result of Turner purchasing MGM's Cartoon and Film library, Warner Bros. pre-1948 content was also acquired, including early Looney Tunes and Merrie Melodies shorts. At launch in the United States, Cartoon Network had an 8,500-hour cartoon library, and it became the first channel dedicated to cartoons. In April 1993, Cartoon Network expanded into foreign markets by launching a Latin American version of Cartoon Network dubbed in both Spanish, Portuguese and English. Cartoon Network's large animation library was in high demand in Western Europe and as a response to consumer demand, Astra 1C, the satellite on which Cartoon Network broadcast on, was launched in May 1993 on board an Ariane 42L rocket from Kourou, French Guiana. Cartoon Network Europe was launched on 17 September 1993, broadcasting from London. It launched only less than 12 months after the original American version and only 16 days after Nickelodeon.

Launch (1993–1999) 

Cartoon Network was originally twinned with TNT and ran from 5am until 7pm, with TNT taking over from 7pm to 5am. Sunday afternoons saw "Super Chunk", which showed back to back episodes of one show for two hours between 1pm and 3pm. Another feature was "The Longest Day", in which Cartoon Network ran for an extra four hours until 11pm in June 1994, every year beginning in 1994. This slot was dedicated to full-length cartoon movies. The first theme was the Checkerboard theme, which showed graphics from its US counterpart and lasted until 1999. The Checkerboard branding package was developed by Hatmaker Studios, now merged and part of its sister company - Corey, McPherson and Nash. Also unlike Nickelodeon, which was part of Sky Multichannels, Cartoon Network was free-to-air across Europe.

Introduction of 24-hour service 
In August 1996, Cartoon Network began running for an extra two hours until 9pm, and in December 1996, along with TNT, it became a 24-hour channel. The full time version was only available on the Astra 1G satellite as the timesharing version of the channel continued to appear on analogue platforms, including on all providers in the UK.  In December 1998, Cartoon Network launched as part of the Sky Digital satellite platform on the Astra 2A satellite. Also, in February 1997, Dutch cable provider A2000/KTA added the 24-hour Cartoon Network and TNT channels to its programming lineup.

From 15 November 1998, Cartoon Network was part of ITV Digital's channel package, airing 24 hours a day until the service collapsed on 1 May 2002.

Separation from Pan-European version 
In October 1999, Cartoon Network officially split from the pan-European feed, this was when the shared transponder analogue feed on Astra 1C became scrambled with VideoCrypt and when the short-lived analogue UK and Ireland only version of TNT launched. Prior to this date, the European version of Cartoon Network moved to Sirius II for serve Central Europe in August 1999 and the French and Spanish version launched at the same time the same month, leaving the ex pan-European version on Astra 1C acting as a de facto free to air secondary/transitional European feed for countries preparing to switchover to their own newly launched local versions of Cartoon Network up until encryption in October 1999. TNT changed its programming from classic movies to general entertainment as the movies were moved to TCM, TNT UK ceased to exist in July 2000 and was replaced by an analogue version of TCM. During the late 90s and the early 2000s, Turner Entertainment Networks International started localising their channels to suit different audiences across different countries around Europe, Middle East and Africa.

Post-pan European split 
After the pan-European split, Cartoon Network revamped on 15 October 1999 with the launch of a unique and more intensive variant of the "Powerhouse" theme which had shapes and tiles with lines and footage of characters from various shows shown on Cartoon Network. This lasted until 1 September 2002 in the UK and was used throughout Europe on 30 September 2002. The European version of Powerhouse was produced by now-defunct London based animation and design studio AMGFX. A DJ theme was used during the AKA Cartoon Network programming block, bumpers include a live-action DJ scratching a record, which affects the playback of a cartoon clip.

On 30 June 2001, the analogue feed on Astra 1C of Cartoon Network and TCM ceased broadcasting, this was when Sky ended its analogue services.

On 11 April 2005, after it was introduced in the United States, Cartoon Network adopted the CN City era until 23 May 2007.

Current events 
On 24 May 2007, Cartoon Network changed its branding to a similar look to ones used during 1999 to 2005, this branding was known as the Arrow Era. There were also alternate Arrow Era idents designed by the design studio, Stardust, which had a 3D style, rather than the 2D style used by the other Arrow Era idents. The British and Irish version of Cartoon Network used both 2D and 3D Arrow Era idents, while other Cartoon Network channels that used the Arrow Era usually either used only one. This branding lasted until 26 September 2010.

On 27 September 2010, the British version of Cartoon Network introduced its current branding and logo while Cartoon Network Too still used the Arrow era until 2012. Designed by Brand New School, it makes heavy use of a black and white checkerboard motif, as well as various CMYK colour variations and patterns. This branding had been introduced earlier in the American version on 29 May 2010. The DOG was moved from the top right corner to the bottom right corner, like in the United States.

On 1 April 2014, Cartoon Network's DOG moved back to the top-right corner and a new Next banner using graphics from the Check It 3.0. branding package was introduced. Also during the same month, Cartoon Network Too closed down and was replaced by a reinstated one-hour timeshift service called Cartoon Network +1, which closed down on 5 March 2006. Cartoon Network's Check It 3.0 was fully implemented on Cartoon Network on 21 July 2014 for the official start of the school summer holidays in the UK, Ninjago: Masters of Spinjitzu also premiered on the channel on the same day. In November 2015, Cartoon Network launched their anti-bullying campaign in conjunction with Childline called Cartoon Network Buddy Network.

After nearly two years of the Laughternoons programming block was replaced by Mega Mondays on 14 April 2014, Laughternoons returned to Cartoon Network for a short period in January 2016. Mega Mondays was the name of Cartoon Network's new episodes programming block for three years before being discontinued in July 2017. It was replaced with New Fridays in March 2018.

In October 2015, Cartoon Network launched their own localised version of the Cartoon Network Anything app, featuring short-form content such as mini-games and video-clips. In February 2016, Cartoon Network used graphics from the Check It 4.0 branding package for the first time on a new episode promo for Transformers: Robots in Disguise. On 25 April 2016, Cartoon Network fully rebranded using graphics from the Check It 4.0 branding package. In April 2016, Cartoon Network signed a deal with Sky for exclusive on-demand boxset rights for a selection of its animated shows. In November 2016, Cartoon Network won two PromaxBDA UK awards for their Where's Ice King and Weetabix Weetabuddies television campaigns. On 21 July 2017, Cartoon Network fully rebranded using graphics from the Dimensional 1.0 branding package. In April 2019, Cartoon Network UK's website was hacked, with a Gumball video replaced with an Arabic meme video.

On November 18, 2020, WarnerMedia was granted a Czech (RRTV) broadcasting licence for Cartoon Network UK and Ireland, entitled Cartoon Network Eire, with the reason being to ensure continued legal carriage of Cartoon Network UK in the Republic of Ireland and Malta in accordance with the EU Audiovisual Media Services Directive (AVMSD) and single market law following the UK's withdrawal from the European Union. Like the UK, the Czech Republic has minimal broadcasting regulations and was chosen for EU licensing purposes as WarnerMedia's HBO had substantial operations located in the country. Editorially, the channel is still managed from Cartoon Network's offices at WarnerMedia's EMEA headquarters in London.

On 20 July 2023, Cartoon Network fully rebranded using graphics from the Pastel 1.0 branding package.

Availability

Cable
Virgin Media : Channel 704 (HD) and Channel 705 (+1)

Online
Now TV: Watch live

Satellite
Sky: Channel 601 (HD), Channel 602 (+1) and Channel 640 (SD)

Terrestrial
BT : Channel 466 (SD) and Channel 473 (HD)

Cartoon Network programmes

Original scheduling 
When Cartoon Network initially launched, its schedule was mainly made up of short cartoons from both Warner Bros. and other studios, such as Looney Tunes, Merrie Melodies and Tom and Jerry. A few years after, it started to broadcast its own programming such as The Powerpuff Girls and Dexter's Laboratory. Eventually, most of Cartoon Network's acquired programming was shifted to the sidelines, with the company's original animated series taking up the majority of Cartoon Network's timeslots.

Programming blocks 
In September 2000, Toonami began broadcasting weekdays for two hours between 4pm until 6pm, and from 9pm until 11pm, as well as weekends from 10am until noon and 10pm until midnight. Dragonball Z had already been airing on Cartoon Network since March 2000, and had been attracting very good ratings, which may have contributed to the decision to launch Toonami in the UK. Its output consisted almost solely of Japanese anime such as the cult Dragonball Z, Tenchi Muyo, and Gundam Wing. The only non-Japanese shows for quite some time were The Real Adventures of Jonny Quest and Batman Beyond. As time went on, Toonami started to shift away from Japanese anime and action programming, eventually morphing into CN Too.

Around the same time, there was almost completely new programming on the channel, and so Boomerang began in a late night slot; it ultimately branched off into its own channel after the block was discontinued.

From February 2012 until July 2017, Cartoon Network shifted its major night of premieres to Monday evenings, under the names "Meaty Mondays", and as of April 2014 "Mega Mondays". Additionally, the block's name would change to "Mince Pie Mondays" every December, sporting a more festive look and airing Christmas specials to boot. In May 2014, a much smaller Friday variety block, titled "Funsize Fridays" was launched. This block only ran for around 2014, and consisted of playing "a different show every fifteen minutes". The shows featured in the block were Adventure Time, The Amazing World of Gumball, Clarence, Johnny Test, Regular Show, Steven Universe, Teen Titans Go!, and Uncle Grandpa. Only one of these shows would air new episodes in this block, passing the baton to a different show monthly.

Eventually, both of these blocks were discontinued, and Cartoon Network was completely devoid of programming blocks for some time. However, in March 2018, a brand new Friday night premiere block launched, under the simple name "New Fridays". The block aired on Friday nights from 4pm to 9pm, and it was based upon the United States feed's "NEW NEW NEW NEW" block, carrying the same neon light branding from its international counterpart. Despite only lasting around four months, the block had a large variety of shows rotating in and out of premiere slots, including Adventure Time, The Amazing World of Gumball, Ben 10, Clarence, Cloudy with a Chance of Meatballs, Mighty Magiswords, Ninjago: Masters of Spinjitzu, OK K.O.! Let's Be Heroes, The Powerpuff Girls, Regular Show, Steven Universe, Supernoobs, Teen Titans Go!, We Bare Bears, Uncle Grandpa, and Unikitty!. The Canadian import Wishfart also had its premiere and new episodes restricted to the block. In July 2018, the block was discontinued unexpectedly.

Cartoonito 
On 1 March 2022, a Cartoonito block was launched, airing on weekdays from 9am to 11am (previously 9am to 10am). Unlike the channel's other programming blocks, it does not air during the school holidays.

Sister networks

Boomerang 

In May 2000, Boomerang was launched by Cartoon Network in the UK and Ireland, and most "classic" cartoons were moved from Cartoon Network to Boomerang, which initially broadcast from 6am to 12am. In October 2001, Boomerang became a 24-hour channel and the remaining "classic" cartoons like The Smurfs, also moved to Boomerang.

Cartoonito 

In May 2007, Cartoonito was launched as a pre-school channel replacing Cartoon Network Too. Cartoonito aired from 4am to 9pm daily. In January 2018, Cartoonito officially began airing 24 hours a day.

Defunct sister networks

CNX 

CNX was a channel operated by Turner Broadcasting System Europe in the UK and Ireland between 2002 and 2003. It was aimed at a male audience, with daytime programming aimed at older children and teenagers, and evening programming aimed at older teenagers and young adults. CNX was carried in the 'Entertainment' section of the Sky programme guide, and was also available on cable

Toonami 

Toonami launched in September 2003 showing action programming. Toonami had originally replaced CNX, which launched in October 2002. In May 2007, Toonami was replaced by Cartoon Network Too which was later shut down.

Cartoon Network Too 

In April 2006, Cartoon Network Too was launched on Sky on the same day as sister TCM 2 and Nick Jr. 2, broadcasting cartoons primarily made by Hanna-Barbera such as Dexter's Laboratory, The Powerpuff Girls, Johnny Bravo and Wacky Races. Cartoon Network Too aired from 3 am to 7 pm every day until May 2007, when it became a 24-hour channel, taking Toonami's slot and getting a new identity. In April 2014, Cartoon Network Too was replaced by a relaunched version of Cartoon Network +1.

Related services

Cartoon Network +1 

Cartoon Network +1 originally launched in 1998 as a one-hour timeshift of Cartoon Network before it was replaced by Cartoon Network Too in April 2006. Cartoon Network +1 was relaunched in April 2014 replacing Cartoon Network Too, just as Cartoon Network Too had replaced them in 2006. In July 2018, Cartoon Network +1 was temporarily replaced by a Ben 10 thematic pop-up channel, the channel reverted to Cartoon Network +1 in July 2018.

Cartoon Network HD 

In September 2011, Cartoon Network HD launched on Sky. In January 2013, Cartoon Network HD launched on Virgin Media's cable TV platform.

Virgin On Demand service 
In April 2007, Cartoon Network launched onto Virgin Media's On Demand system, thus allowing Virgin Media customers to watch Cartoon Network programmes whenever they like. They can also take advantage of pause, rewind and fast forward functions, when watching these programmes.

Hanna-Barbera Studios Europe 

Hanna-Barbera Studios Europe (formerly Cartoon Network Studios Europe, Great Malbrough Productions, Inc. & Cartoon Network Development Studio Europe) is based in Shoreditch, London, located three miles away from Turner EMEA's headquarters. The studio was named after Great Marlborough Street where Turner Europe, Middle East and Africa's headquarters is located. The studio is the European equivalent to Cartoon Network Studios based in Burbank, California, USA. The studio was founded in 2007 and in 2011 it produced its first show, The Amazing World of Gumball, created by Ben Bocquelet. Cartoon Network Europe has also been involved in other co-productions in the past such as The Cramp Twins, Fat Dog Mendoza, Robotboy, Scooby-Doo! Mystery Incorporated, Elfy Food, The Happos Family, Hero 108, Spaced Out, VBirds, Cult Toons, Taffy, Best Ed, Chop Socky Chooks, Skatoony and The Heroic Quest of the Valiant Prince Ivandoe. The studio has also produced animation for the Malaria No More organisation. Originally, the studio's main focus was to produce animated shorts that could potentially become animated shows, this changed when production of The Amazing World of Gumball moved from Boulder Media and Dandelion Studios and went in-house with Studio Soi offering support. In September 2018, Cartoon Network Studios Europe's London-based studio will start production on a new animated show, Elliott from Earth.

2006 power outage 
On the night of 26–27 July 2006, Cartoon Network, along with its sister channels suffered a major technical fault due to a power cut in Soho, London, owing to the 2006 European heat wave, with thunderstorms taking full force overnight.

The power cut caused a mix up of Turner Broadcasting System Europe channels (i.e. Cartoon Network being broadcast on Boomerang and Toonami, with Boomerang being broadcast on Cartoon Network Too). Boomerang +1 was off air for some time, while TCM, reverted between TCM France and other programming during the times it was able to provide a service.

TCM 2 remained unaffected due to its downtime of timesharing. Most advertising was suspended and several of the channel websites were offline also. Those who could still receive the channels had a backup transmission played out, making people confused when Cartoon Network Too and Boomerang were showing episodes of The Flintstones at the same time. These backups where played out with a scrolling message which said "We apologise for the disruption to this programme due to technical problems and we are trying to correct the fault. We will resume normal programming as soon as possible" in multiple languages.

Whilst most channels returned to the air within 5–10 minutes, it took longer for Cartoon Network Too to resume programming and it was also joked on various animation based forums by Toonami UK viewers, many of whom have made note of their disdain for the direction in which Turner took the brand in the UK, that the backup transmission was more entertaining, purely due to the lack of live action programming aired during the outage.

The idents on Toonami which aired between shows during the black-out displayed the message "Sorry! Toonami is broken, we'll be right back as soon as we fix it.". These idents have since been re-used in disclaimers warning viewers not to try stunts on various shows at home.

Animated shorts 
The studio has also produced animated shorts. Animated shorts produced by the studio include The Furry Pals, Mutant Moments, Hamshanks and the Himalolly Railway, Elliot's Zoo, Pinky Malinky and Verne on Vacation. The shorts were showcased in a similar way to Cartoonstitute by the American version of Cartoon Network. The videos were available to watch on the Cartoon Network Development Studio Europe YouTube channel which has since closed.

See also 
 Cartoon Network Too
 Boomerang (UK & Ireland)
 Cartoonito (UK & Ireland)
 Cartoonito (brand)
 CNX
 Toonami (UK & Ireland)
 Turner Broadcasting System Europe

References

External links 

 
 Official Laughternoons website
 Turner employment and information website

Television channels in the United Kingdom
Television channels and stations established in 1993
1993 establishments in the United Kingdom
Cartoon Network
Turner Broadcasting System Europe
Turner Broadcasting System UK & Ireland
Children's television networks
Children's television channels in the United Kingdom
English-language television stations in the United Kingdom
English-language television stations in Ireland
Television stations in Malta
Television stations in Ireland
Warner Bros. Discovery EMEA